Crato Esporte Clube is a Brazilian professional football club based in Crato, Ceará. It competes in the Série D, the fourth tier of Brazilian football, as well as in the Campeonato Cearense, the top flight of the Ceará state football league.

History
The club was founded on November 11, 1997. They finished in the second position in the Campeonato Cearense Second Level in 1999, when they lost the competition to Guarany, and in 2009, when they lost the competition to Limoeiro.

Stadium
Crato Esporte Clube play their home games at Estádio Municipal Governador Virgílio Távora, nicknamed Mirandão. The stadium has a maximum capacity of 10,000 people.

External links
facebook

References

Association football clubs established in 1997
Football clubs in Ceará
1997 establishments in Brazil